Xtream Arena powered by Mediacom is a multipurpose arena in Coralville, Iowa, that opened in September 2020. The main tenants of the arena are the Iowa Hawkeyes volleyball teams and the professional ice hockey team Iowa Heartlanders of the ECHL.

History
In 2019, Mediacom was announced as the naming rights partner via its Xtream brand.

The city lost its investment-grade bond rating as a result of the project.

Tenants
The arena serves as the home court of the nearby University of Iowa's volleyball team.

Developers had expressed interest in luring a USHL or ECHL franchise. On September 17, 2020, the city announced it had come to an agreement to host an ECHL team that was approved to begin play for in the 2021–22 season named the Iowa Heartlanders. They played their first game in the arena on October 22, 2021 against the Kansas City Mavericks.

References

External links
 Official site

Buildings and structures in Johnson County, Iowa
Coralville, Iowa
2020 establishments in Iowa
Indoor arenas in Iowa
Indoor ice hockey venues in the United States